LeVar or Levar may refer to:


People

Given name
LeVar Burton (born 1957), American actor, presenter, director and author
Levar Fisher (born 1979), American football linebacker
Levar Harper-Griffith (born 1981), American professional tennis player
Levar Stoney (born 1981), American politician and mayor of Richmond, Virginia
LeVar Woods (born 1978), American football coach at the University of Iowa
Percy Levar Walton (born 1978), American convicted of three murders

Surname
Milan Levar (c. 1954–2000), Croatian whistleblower
Patrick Levar (born c. 1951), former alderman of the 45th ward of Chicago

Places
Lavar, Bandar Abbas, Iran
Lavar, Bastak, Iran
Lavar, Gilan, Iran
Lavar, Kohgiluyeh and Boyer-Ahmad, Iran

See also
Lavar (disambiguation)
Lever (disambiguation)